Frederick Stephenson (24 April 1853 – July 1927) was an English cricketer active from 1875 to 1877 who played for Lancashire. He was born in Todmorden. He appeared in two first-class matches as a lefthanded batsman who bowled left arm fast with a roundarm action. He scored no runs and held two catches. He took one wicket with a best analysis of one for 17.

Stephenson made his debut in first-class cricket for Lancashire against Kent at the Catford Bridge in 1875. A second and final first-class appearance for Lancashire came against Derbyshire at Derby in 1877.

He died in July 1927, aged 74.

Notes

1853 births
1927 deaths
People from Todmorden
English cricketers
Lancashire cricketers
Cricketers from Yorkshire